Trevor Kilkelly is a New Zealand former rugby league footballer who represented New Zealand in the 1960 World Cup.

Playing career
Kilkelly grew up on the West Coast playing for the Brunner club. He was named as the West Coast's reserve hooker when only 17 years old.

Kilkelly later moved to join the Sydenham club in the Canterbury Rugby League competition and made his representative debut for Canterbury in 1952 and his South Island debut in 1953. That year he was also an unused reserve for New Zealand but it would not be until 1955 when he made his debut for New Zealand, playing on the tour of Great Britain and France. During the 1955 season Kilkelly had switched positions from hooker to the second row.

He captained Canterbury in 1956 and played home tests against Great Britain in 1958 and France in 1960. He also toured Australia in 1959 and went to Great Britain as part of the 1960 World Cup squad. He retired from international football after the World Cup, having played in 30 games including eleven test matches.

Midway through the 1957 season Kilkelly had returned the Brunner club in the West Coast Rugby League competition and he finally represented his home province in 1957. He went on the play for the West Coast until 1963 when he left for Australia, playing the 1964 season with the Manly-Warringah Sea Eagles.

References

Living people
New Zealand rugby league players
New Zealand national rugby league team players
Canterbury rugby league team players
West Coast rugby league team players
South Island rugby league team players
Sydenham Swans players
Brunner players
Manly Warringah Sea Eagles players
Rugby league hookers
Rugby league second-rows
Year of birth missing (living people)